
Gmina Kłodawa is a rural gmina (administrative district) in Gorzów County, Lubusz Voivodeship, in western Poland.

The gmina contains part of the protected area called Barlinek-Gorzów Landscape Park.

Villages
Gmina Kłodawa contains the villages and settlements of Chwalęcice, Kłodawa, Lipy, Łośno, Mironice, Mszaniec, Rębowo, Różanki, Różanki-Szklarnia, Rybakowo, Santocko, Santoczno, Wojcieszyce, Zamoksze and Zdroisko.

Neighbouring gminas
Gmina Kłodawa is bordered by the city of Gorzów Wielkopolski and by the gminas of Barlinek, Lubiszyn, Nowogródek Pomorski, Santok and Strzelce Krajeńskie.

Twin towns – sister cities

Gmina Kłodawa is twinned with:
 Seelow-Land, Germany

References

Klodawa
Gorzów County